This is a list of all military equipment ever used by the United States. This list will deal with all the equipment ever used by all branches of the United States Armed Forces. The list will include lists of all military equipment ever used by a certain branch of the US armed forces as well as all US military equipment in a certain time period like World War II.

US Army and US Marines Corps 
 List of military weapons of the United States

US Navy 
 List of United States Navy ships

US Airforce 
 List of military aircraft of the United States

US Coast Guard 
 List of United States Coast Guard cutters

US Space Force 
 Equipment of the United States Space Force

References

United States
Equipment